Bartsch-Jasper House, also known as the August Bartsch House, Henry Jasper House, and Charles Kampschroeder House, is a historic home located at Washington, Franklin County, Missouri. It was built about 1855 and expanded to its present size about 1893.  It is a -story, double entrance, brick dwelling on a stone foundation.  It has a side gable roof and open hip roofed front porch with turned support posts.

It was listed on the National Register of Historic Places in 2000.

References

Houses on the National Register of Historic Places in Missouri
Houses completed in 1855
Buildings and structures in Franklin County, Missouri
National Register of Historic Places in Franklin County, Missouri